Franconville is a commune in the Val-d'Oise department in Île-de-France in northern France. It is a northwestern suburb of Paris, located 17.1 km. (10.6 miles) from the center of Paris.

Population

Transport
Franconville is served by Franconville – Le Plessis-Bouchard station on Paris RER line C and on the Transilien Paris-Nord suburban rail line.

Twin towns
  Viernheim, Hesse, Germany (since 1966)
  Potters Bar, Hertfordshire, England, United Kingdom (since 1973)

Personalities

Culture 

Jean Daudin, French canon, translator of humanist and Italian poet Petrarch, was born in Franconville.
 Marcel L'Enfant(1884-1963), post-impressionist painter has lived and worked Chaussée Jules-César in Franconville for 40 years (1923-1963).
André Vaquier (1886-1976), librarian and historian, has lived in Franconville for many years.
 Jean Daurand (1913-1989), actor, had a Café named Les Cinq Dernières Minutes in Franconville.
Hassan Koubba (born 1973), actor.
 Lorie, singer and actress.
 Massacra (1987-1997], Death Metal band.

Sports 

 Stéphane Diagana (born 1969) was a member of an athelic club in Franconville.
 Éric Rabésandratana (born 1972]), football-player (Paris-Saint-Germain), was a player in the FC Franconville Plessis Bouchard team.
 Bouchra Ghezielle (born 1979]), athlete
 Mickaël Hanany (born 1983]), high-jumper
 David Alerte (born 1984]), sprinter
 David N'Gog (born 1989]), football player in Liverpool FC

Science 

 Antoine-Alexis Cadet de Vaux ( 1743-1828]), chemist, philanthropist.
 Jean-François Clervoy (born 1958]), astronaut.
Gustave-Joseph Witkowski (1844-1922), doctor.

Religion 

 Jacques Baudoin (1630-1715), priest.

See also
Communes of the Val-d'Oise department

References

External links
Official website 
Association of Mayors of the Val d'Oise 

Communes of Val-d'Oise